Iran's virtual parliament (Persian: پارلمان مجازی ایران) was inaugurated on December 8, 2020 in the presence of Parliament Speaker Mohammad Baqer Qalibaf

References

External links 
Official web site of Virtual Parliament of Iran

Politics of Iran